The Ministry of Women, Youth, Sports and Social Affais (MWYSSA) is a government ministry of Kiribati, headquartered in South Tarawa, Tarawa.
The ministry was created in October 2013.

Ministers
Tangariki Reete (2013–2016)
David Collins (2016–2018)
Kourabi Nenem (2018–2019), Vice President and Minister for Women, Youth, Sports and Social Affairs (MWYSSA), before 2018, he was Minister for Public Works & Utilities
Taoaba Kaiea (2019–2020) 
 Martin Moreti (2020–)

References

External links
 Ministry of Women

Women's ministries
Sports ministries
Youth ministries
Sport in Kiribati
Government of Kiribati
Kiribati
Women in Kiribati
Women's rights in Kiribati